Stamford Raffles-Flint (6 February 1847 – 15 August 1925) was Archdeacon of Cornwall from 1916 until his death.

He was the son of William Charles Raffles Flint and his wife Jenny Rosdew Mudge, daughter of Richard Zachariah Mudge, educated at Eton and University College, Oxford and ordained in 1871. After a curacy at Alverstoke he was Rector of Ladock from 1885 until  1920 when he  became Canon Residentiary and Treasurer of Truro Cathedral. In 1884 he married Ethel Maud Quentin, sister of George Quentin.

References

1847 births
People educated at Eton College
Alumni of University College, Oxford
Archdeacons of Cornwall
1925 deaths